Othoes is a genus of Galeodid camel spiders, first described by Arthur Hirst in 1911.

Species 
, the World Solifugae Catalog accepts the following five species:

 Othoes floweri Hirst, 1911 — Sudan
 Othoes hirsti Lawrence, 1954 — Saudi Arabia
 Othoes rimmonensis Panouse, Levy & Shulov, 1967 — Israel
 Othoes saharae Panouse, 1960 — Algeria, Mauritania
 Othoes vittatus Hirst, 1912 — Israel

References 

Arachnid genera
Solifugae